The Pezzata Mòchena, known in Mòcheno as the , is an indigenous breed of domestic goat from the Autonomous Province of Trento, in north-eastern Italy. It originates from the Valle dei Mòcheni, also known as the Valle del Fersina and as the Bersntol, which since the fourteenth century has been home to a Mòcheno-speaking population of Bavarian origin; the breed may for this reason also be called the Valle dei Mòcheni.

The breed was recognised in 2004, and the herdbook established in March 2005. The Pezzata Mòchena is one of the forty-three autochthonous Italian goat breeds of limited distribution for which a herdbook is kept by the Associazione Nazionale della Pastorizia, the Italian national association of sheep- and goat-breeders.

At the end of 2013 the registered population was variously reported as 261 and as 274.

References

Goat breeds
Dairy goat breeds
Goat breeds originating in Italy